The 1950 Green Bay Packers season was their 32nd season overall and their 30th season in the National Football League. The team finished with a 3–9 record under first-year head coach Gene Ronzani for a fifth-place finish in the National Conference.

Offseason
To get the franchise on a firm financial footing, the team started selling stocks publicly for the first time. The stock drive netted $118,000. To replace Curly Lambeau, the Packers named Gene Ronzani as their new head coach and Vice President. The year also saw another change as the team changed its colors to green and yellow from the navy that the club had been wearing.

NFL draft

Incomplete list

 Yellow indicates a future Pro Bowl selection

Regular season

Schedule

Standings

Passing

Roster

Awards, records, and honors

References

 Packers on Pro Football Reference
 Sportsencyclopedia.com

Green Bay Packers seasons
Green Bay Packers
Green